Lars Svensson may refer to:
 Lars Svensson (ornithologist) (born 1941), Swedish ornithologist
 Lars Georg Svensson, American thoracic and cardiovascular surgeon
 Lars E. O. Svensson (born 1947), Swedish economist
 Lars Svensson (ice hockey) (1926–1999), Swedish ice hockey player